Kalman Radio is a Bosnian commercial radio station, broadcasting from Sarajevo.

Kalman Radio began broadcasting in April 1997. It was formatted as a variety radio station with Bosnian music, talk shows and short national news.

Frequenciess
As of 2016, the program is broadcast at four frequencies: (Sarajevo , Central Bosnia , Mostar area , Tuzla area ) and via Eutelsat W2 (16° E, 12640 MHz, V, S.R: 6.510, FEC 2/3).

References

External links 
 Official website
 Communications Regulatory Agency of Bosnia and Herzegovina

See also 
List of radio stations in Bosnia and Herzegovina

Sarajevo
Radio stations established in 1997
Mass media in Sarajevo